The following is a list of the MTV Europe Music Award winners of special awards.

Artist's Choice Award

MTV Voice Award

Power of Music Award

Ultimate Legend Award

Video Visionary Award

Best Act Ever

Best Song with a Social Message

Generation Change Award

See also 
 MTV Europe Music Award for Global Icon
 Free Your Mind

References

MTV Europe Music Awards